Viviana A. Rotman Zelizer (born January 19, 1946) is an American sociologist and the Lloyd Cotsen '50 Professor of Sociology at Princeton University. She is an economic sociologist who focuses on the attribution of cultural and moral meaning to the economy. A constant theme in her work is economic valuation of the sacred, as found in such contexts as life insurance settlements and economic transactions between sexual intimates. In 2006 she was elected to the PEN American Center and in 2007 she was elected to both the American Academy of Arts & Sciences and the American Philosophical Society.

Early life and career
Viviana Zelizer was born on January 19, 1946, in Buenos Aires, to S. Julio Rotman and Rosita Weill de Rotman. She attended University of Buenos Aires and studied law for two years. She emigrated to the United States in 1967 when she married her husband, Rabbi Gerald L. Zelizer, formerly the rabbi of Congregation Neve Shalom in Metuchen, New Jersey. She attended Rutgers University where she graduated, Phi Beta Kappa, with a B.A. in 1971. She went on to graduate school in sociology at Columbia University where she received an MPhil and an M.A. in 1974. In 1977, Zelizer received a Ph.D. in sociology.

Zelizer has identified four scholars at Columbia who influenced her intellectual career: Sigmund Diamond, Bernard Barber, David Rothman, and Robert K. Merton. Diamond (whose PhD was in history) and Barber were her primary mentors in sociology, and Rothman in the history department. Zelizer has said that Merton was always present, but at a distance.

Zelizer's unique approach to sociology by way of social history was an initial burden, as she recounts:I remember all too painfully an early interview for a job in a university sociology department during which my interrogators asked pointedly how my social historical research qualified as sociology at all.

Zelizer joined the Department of Sociology at Rutgers University from 1976 to 1978. In 1976, she took an assistant professorship at Barnard College and Graduate Faculty of Columbia University, and advanced to full professor in 1985. She then joined the sociology faculty at Columbia University as a full professor, where she chaired the Department of Sociology from 1992 to 1996. She was named the Lloyd Cotsen '50 Professor of Sociology in 2002.

From 1987 to 1988 she was a visiting scholar at the Russell Sage Foundation, where she met another visiting scholar, sociologist Charles Tilly. At Princeton she interacted with influential colleagues Paul DiMaggio and Alejandro Portes, as well as Michael Katz, then at the University of Pennsylvania.

In 1996–1997, Zelizer was a John Simon Guggenheim Memorial Foundation Fellow and a National Endowment for the Humanities Fellow at the Institute for Advanced Study.

In 2001, she was the elected the first chair of the newly created Economic Sociology section of the American Sociological Association. In 2003 the Economic Sociology section named its annual book prize the Viviana A. Zelizer Distinguished Book Award. In 2001 she was elected a member of the Council of the section on Comparative/Historical Sociology of the ASA.

Zelizer's son, Julian Zelizer, joined Princeton's Department of History Public Affairs in 2007, becoming what is believed to be the first mother-son professorial team in Princeton's history.

Contributions

 1985 C.W. Mills Award, Society for the Study of Social Problems, for Pricing the Priceless Child: The Changing Social Value of Children
 1996 Culture Section Book Award, American Sociological Association, for The Social Meaning of Money

Major works
 Economic Lives: How Culture Shapes the Economy, Princeton University Press. (2010). 
 The Purchase of Intimacy, Princeton University Press. (2005). 
 The Social Meaning of Money: Pin Money, Paychecks, Poor Relief, and Other Currencies, Basic Books. (1994). 
 Pricing the Priceless Child: The Changing Social Value of Children, Princeton University Press. (1985). 
 Morals and Markets: The Development of Life Insurance in the United States, Columbia University Press. (1979).

References

External links
 Princeton Sociology Department
 Prof. Zelizer's faculty homepage
 

1946 births
Living people
Princeton University faculty
American sociologists
American women sociologists
Members of the American Philosophical Society
21st-century American women